Luíz Eugênio Pérez (May 5, 1928 – November 14, 2012) was the Catholic bishop of the Diocese of Jabuticabal. Brazil.

Ordained to the priesthood in 1954, Pérez was named bishop in 1970 and retired in 2003.

Notes

1928 births
2012 deaths
20th-century Roman Catholic bishops in Brazil
21st-century Roman Catholic bishops in Brazil
Roman Catholic bishops of Jaboticabal
Roman Catholic bishops of Jales